The 2012–13 Liga III season is the 57th season of the Liga III, the third tier of the Romanian football league system. Day one was played on August 31, 2012 and the last round was played on May 30, 2013. The first team in each series will promote at the end of the season to the Liga II, and the teams that finish 10-16 will relegate to the Liga IV. From the teams that finish 9th, another three are relegated, but separate standings are computed, only results against teams that finished 1-8 are taken into consideration.

This season was close to a disaster, only 78 teams registered, although 96 spots were available (6x16), thus 18 spots remained unoccupied. From the 78, 5 withdrew from the championship during the first half, CSO Plopeni, Sevișul Șelimbăr, Oltchim Râmnicu Vâlcea, FCM Huși and FC Cisnădie, thus 73 remained in the tables.

During the second half of the championship another 7 teams withdrew, only 66 teams remained out of 96 spots. This teams were: Young Stars Panciu, Rapid București II, Eolica Baia, CSM Focșani, Jiul Petroșani, FCM Turda and Girom Albota.

League tables

Seria I

Seria II

Seria III

Seria IV

Seria V

Seria VI

See also

 2012–13 Liga I
 2012–13 Liga II
 2012–13 Liga IV

References

Liga III seasons
3
Romania